Worldly Girl  is a 2016 Italian drama film co-written and directed by Marco Danieli, at his feature film debut.

The film was screened at the 73rd edition of the Venice Film Festival  in the Venice Days section, in which it was awarded the Lizzani Award and the Brian Award.

Cast  
  
 Sara Serraiocco as Giulia
 Michele Riondino as Libero  
 Marco Leonardi 
 Stefania Montorsi 
 Pippo Delbono

See also    
 List of Italian films of 2016

References

External links  

2016 films
2016 drama films
Italian drama films
2016 directorial debut films
2010s Italian films